Joel Hayward  (born 1964) is a New Zealand-born British scholar, writer and poet. The daily newspaper Al Khaleej called Hayward "a world authority on international conflict and strategy". The National newspaper called Hayward "eminent" and a "distinguished historian of warfare and military strategy". Kirkus Reviews said that Hayward is a "renowned" historian and "undeniably one of academia's most visible Islamic thinkers". He is considered to be one of "the world's five hundred most influential Muslims," with his listing in the 2023 edition of The Muslim 500 stating that "he weaves together classical Islamic knowledge and methodologies and the source-critical Western historical method to make innovative yet carefully reasoned sense of complex historical issues that are still important in today's world." A professor of strategy at the Rabdan Academy in Abu Dhabi in the United Arab Emirates, he is a historian by discipline with specializations in both western and Islamic strategic thought and military history. He is best known for his published books and articles on strategic and security matters, including the use of air power, his 2003 biography of Horatio Lord Nelson, his writing and teaching on the Islamic concepts of war, strategy and conflict, his Sirah works on Muhammad, and his works of fiction and poetry.

In November 2012 he became full Professor of International and Civil Security at Khalifa University in Abu Dhabi and in 2013 he became Chair of the Department of Humanities and Social Sciences at Khalifa. He also served there as the Director of the Institute of International and Civil Security. Earlier in 2012, he was a Senior Fellow at the Markfield Institute of Higher Education and a Research Fellow of the Cambridge Muslim College. His career highlights include having been Dean of the Royal Air Force College, Cranwell for five years (2007-2011), a Director of the Royal Air Force Centre for Air Power Studies think-tank for four years (2008-2012), and the academic Head of Air Power Studies at King's College London for six years (2005-2011). He is a professor of strategy at the Indonesian Defense University and he holds fellowships from the United States Air Force and the Federal Government of Germany. He is a Fellow of both the Royal Society of Arts and the Royal Historical Society. With the title of Shaykh he has earned ijazas in ʿAqīdah and Sirah.

Early life and education 
Joel Hayward was born on 27 May 1964 in Christchurch, New Zealand.

In 1988 Hayward enrolled with the University of Canterbury in Christchurch to pursue a Bachelor of Arts degree in Classics and History, which he received on 8 May 1991. Following this, he commenced a Master's Degree program in 1991. For his thesis, Hayward analyzed the historiography of Holocaust denial. Hayward was also required to complete four honours papers, which he wrote during 1992. These papers (awarded an A−, two As, and an A+) together constituted half of Hayward's master's program. Hayward's thesis was written in 1991, prior to his four honours papers, with the conclusion written in early 1993. His M.A. in history with First Class Honours was conferred on 7 May 1993. His thesis was judged the best history thesis of his year and it won him the Sir James Hight Memorial Prize for "excellence" and the honour of wearing the Philip Ross May Gown at the graduation ceremony.

Awarded a scholarship, Hayward went on to pursue a PhD degree, also at University of Canterbury, again under the supervision of Vincent Orange. His topic was an analysis of German air operations during the eastern campaigns of World War II, based on unpublished German archival sources. In 1994, the U.S. Air Force Historical Research Agency, located within the Air University at Maxwell Air Force Base, Alabama, awarded him a research fellowship to conduct research for his dissertation in its archives. He subsequently received a research fellowship from the Federal Government of Germany which enabled him to conduct primary research in the German Military Archives in Freiburg, Germany. Hayward was awarded his PhD in 1996. His dissertation, Seeking the Philosopher's Stone: Luftwaffe Operations during Hitler's Drive to the East, 1942–1943 became the basis of his first book, Stopped at Stalingrad: The Luftwaffe and Hitler's Defeat in the East 1942-1943., which was acclaimed upon its publication in 1998.

Academic and professional career

Massey University 
In June 1996 Hayward joined the History Department of Massey University (Palmerston North Campus) as a lecturer in defence and strategic studies, receiving promotion to Senior Lecturer in August 1999. He specialized in the theoretical and conceptual aspects of modern warfare, airpower, joint doctrines, and manoeuvre warfare. He continued in that position until June 2002. He was made Head of the Defence and Strategic Studies program.

While at Massey, Hayward convened annual defence conferences. He also edited a book based on one of the conferences' themes: Joint Future? The Move to Jointness and Its Implications for the New Zealand Defence Force.

From 1997 to 2004 he was also a lecturer at the Officer Cadet School of the New Zealand Army, where he taught military history from Alexander the Great to the Balkan Wars, and at the Command and Staff College of the Royal New Zealand Air Force, where he taught airpower history and doctrine and supervised advanced research in military history. During the same period he also taught strategic thought at the Royal New Zealand Naval College. He also wrote academic articles for defence and strategic studies publications.

Work in the United Kingdom 
Hayward lived and worked in the United Kingdom from 2004 to 2012 first teaching strategy and operational art at the Joint Services Command and Staff College. In November 2005 he became the head of the newly created Air Power Studies Division, a specialist unit of Defence Studies academics established by the Royal Air Force and King's College London at the Royal Air Force College, Cranwell. Hayward was appointed Dean of the RAF College, Cranwell in April 2007. He was a Director of the Royal Air Force Centre for Air Power Studies, the Air Force's national thinktank. He was also a member of the CAS Air Power Workshop, a small and highly select working group of scholars and other theorists convened by the Chief of Air Staff (the head of the Royal Air Force.)

He is a member of the editorial advisory boards of the academic journals, Air Power Review and Global War Studies. He taught on air power concepts at various staff colleges and universities throughout Europe and in 2007 taught a course on "Air Power and Ethics" in Trondheim, Norway, to the Norwegian Air Force On 13 May 2009 he was a keynote speaker at the 2009 Air Power Asia conference in Singapore, where he spoke on "Air Power And Ecology: Destruction of Enemies But Not The Environment". He convened an international academic conference on that subject – the environmental impact of modern air warfare – in August 2009. In October 2010 he spoke at the Global Peace and Unity (GPU) conference in London, attended by 80,000 people, on the subject: "War & Ethics: The Compatibility of 'Western' and Islamic Thought".

Hayward gave strategic advice to political and military leaders in several countries, gave policy advice to various Islamic sheikhs, and tutored His Royal Highness Prince William of Wales. In 2011 Hayward was elected as a Fellow of the Royal Society of Arts and in 2012 he was elected as a Fellow of the Royal Historical Society.

Islam and anti-radicalisation 

A Muslim who teaches at anti-extremism workshops, Hayward converted to Islam in 2005. He supports Muslims serving in the British armed forces and is a member of the UK Armed Forces Muslim Association. He has written regular politics-related columns in Emel and other Islamic magazines. In an article critical of some ostensible Muslim anger seen online, Hayward describes himself as "a moderate and politically liberal revert who chose to embrace the faith of Islam because of its powerful spiritual truths, its emphasis on peace and justice, its racial and ethnic inclusiveness and its charitable spirit towards the poor and needy." In 2010, he wrote the Introduction to Shaykh Muhammad Tahir-ul-Qadri's Fatwa on Terrorism and Suicide Bombings (London: Minhaj-ul-Quran International). Hayward, who sharply criticizes all Islamic terrorism in the fatwa's introduction, shares Tahir-ul-Qadri's scholarly assessment "that regardless of any motives, terrorism can never be supported and is in fact condemned by the Holy Quran and the Sunnah." In 2011 Qadri appointed Hayward to a senior role as his (and Minhaj-ul-Quran's) Strategic Policy Advisor, although he ceased that role when he moved to the Middle East.

Hayward also wrote and formally signed the London Declaration, a Muslim public statement issued under the auspices of Minhaj-ul-Quran which unequivocally condemns all extremism and terrorism, "because at the heart of all religions is a belief in the sanctity of the lives of the innocent." The Declaration adds: "The indiscriminate nature of terrorism, which has in recent years killed far more civilians and other non-combatants than it has combatants, is un-Islamic, un-Judaic, un-Christian and it is indeed incompatible with the true teachings of all faiths." The London Declaration also "unequivocally condemn[s] anti-Semitism (including when sometimes it is disingenuously clothed as anti-Zionism), Islamophobia (including when it is sometimes disingenuously dressed up as patriotism) and all other forms of racism and xenophobia."

In October 2013, Hayward won substantial damages in a successful libel case against the Mail on Sunday and the Daily Mail, which had originally criticised what it claimed were Hayward's Islamic views whilst dean of the RAF College. The Mail apology of 13 October 2013 stated: "On 7 and 8 August 2011 we suggested that the beliefs of Dr Joel Hayward, then the Dean of the RAF College Cranwell, prevented him from fulfilling his duty of impartiality and fairness as a teacher in the RAF" and had caused him "to show undue favouritism to Islamic students and spend too much time on Islamic activities. We now accept that these allegations are untrue. We apologise to Dr Hayward and have paid a substantial sum to him in damages."

Work in the United Arab Emirates 
In November 2012, Hayward became full Professor of International and Civil Security in Khalifa University's Institute for International and Civil Security. In 2013 he became Chair of the Department of Humanities and Social Sciences at Khalifa. He also serves there as the Director of the Institute of International and Civil Security. In 2014 he received two ijazas, which are the permission certificates or licenses used by Sunni shaykhs to indicate that they have authorized someone to transmit a certain topic of Islamic knowledge. Hayward also researches comparative religions and studies the scriptures of the three Abrahamic faiths in their original languages (Hebrew, Greek and Arabic). Hayward performed the Hajj pilgrimage in 2014. In 2014 he also joined the editorial board of the Islamic Studies journal, Islamic Rethink. On 5 October 2016 he was named as the "Best Professor of Humanities and Social Sciences" at the 2016 Middle East Education Leadership Awards. He praises the tolerance and inclusiveness of the UAE: "Here the Islam that's practised is gentle and moderate. It's a beautiful experience to live as a Muslim in the UAE. It's liberating and wonderful." Similarly, in 2022 he said that he "feels lucky to be living in the UAE, which he describes as a Muslim country 'that has so easily and fully embraced modernity and done so with success'. I have been here a decade and I call the UAE home. I wish I could stay here forever. I can't imagine being anywhere else."

Reputation within Islamic studies

In 2022, he was selected as one of "the world's five hundred most influential Muslims," with his listing in the 2023 edition of The Muslim 500 stating that "he weaves together classical Islamic knowledge and methodologies and the source-critical Western historical method to make innovative yet carefully reasoned sense of complex historical issues that are still important in today's world." His life and scholarship have been positively detailed in feature articles in newspapers across the Islamic world, including in the UAE, Algeria, Saudi Arabia, Indonesia, and India.

M.A. thesis 
Hayward's 1991 M.A. thesis was submitted in 1993 yet was unavailable for public study until 1999. When it became available, it ignited controversy. Hayward was accused of advancing arguments which gave credence to Holocaust deniers. In 2000, at the request of the New Zealand Jewish Council, the University of Canterbury convened a "Working Party" which issued a report admonishing the university for inadequately supervising Hayward's work. The report found that Hayward's thesis "demonstrates impressive industry and intelligence" and did not "establish dishonesty" on his part, but it was also "seriously flawed". Subsequent to the issuance of the Working Party's report, the university apologized to the New Zealand Jewish community, as Hayward also had earlier in the year. Hayward has always repudiated the errors in his thesis, saying that they were the result of inadequate scholarly preparation for such a complex topic, but Holocaust deniers initially cited the thesis as evidence of academic support for their positions. In 2000, Holocaust denier David Irving praised Hayward's work as a "landmark in the turning of the tide in the favour of historical revisionism".

Despite these issues, Hayward clearly upholds the sound and accepted scholarly assessment of the Holocaust. In 2010 he described it as "one of history's vilest crimes ... involving the organised murder of millions of Jews" and in 2011 he similarly wrote: "The Holocaust of the Jews in the Second World War, one of history's vilest crimes, involved the organised murder of six million Jews by Germans and others who considered themselves Christians or at least members of the Christian value system." Likewise, in his 2012 book, Warfare in the Quran, he criticised "the undoubted evils of Nazism". In a 2018 interview, he said: "I can't help but conclude that humans are, by and large, rather unkind to each other and sometimes utterly hateful. ... How else can we explain ordinary German soldiers and paramilitary people murdering six million Jewish civilians in history's greatest atrocity?"

Writing

Non-fiction
Hayward has authored or co-authored many peer reviewed journal articles pertaining to strategic matters, including "Stalingrad: An Examination of Hitler's Decision to Airlift" which the U.S. Air Force published in both English and Spanish, and "The Qur'an and War: Observations on Islamic Just War", published in the official RAF academic journal, Air Power Review, Vol. 13, No. 3, Autumn/Winter 2010, pp. 41–63.

Hayward is the author or editor of seventeen non-fiction books, including Stopped at Stalingrad: The Luftwaffe and Hitler's Defeat in the East 1942-1943 (1998 and subsequent editions). An assessment of aerial warfare at the Battle of Stalingrad, Stopped at Stalingrad was acclaimed upon its release. The Readers Guide to Military History describes the book as "a magnificently researched study ... [which] provides the best available account of the disastrous Stalingrad airlift." The book is "an advanced and exhaustive work that will become a standard in the field once it is better known." It was favorably reviewed in, amongst other places, the Times Literary Supplement and the journal War in History. In 2015, Hayward published the first Polish translation of this book as Zatrzymani pod Stalingradem: Klęska Luftwaffe i Hitlera na wschodzie 1942-1943.

Hayward's biography of naval commander Horatio Lord Nelson, For God and Glory: Lord Nelson and His Way of War (2003), likewise received positive notices, with one reviewer recommending it as "a fascinating work of strategic philosophy. ... The result is surprisingly persuasive.  [Its arguments] are thought-provoking and, in places, offer fresh ways of understanding what happened." It was rated as "outstanding" by members of the 2004 University Press Books Committee, a rating defined "as having exceptional editorial content and subject matter" and considered essential to most library collections.

The Press newspaper called his co-authored 2003 book on military leadership, Born to Lead? Portraits of New Zealand Commanders, "inspirational" and said that it is "a ground-breaking collection of essays."

Hayward's 2009 book Air Power, Insurgency and the "War on Terror" was similarly praised. Reviewing it for The Journal of Military History, Michael Robert Terry  "strongly" recommended it, noting that it provides "thought provoking reading" and "much needed critical thinking" on the complex utility of air power within counter-insurgency wars.

The Royal Aal al-Bayt Institute for Islamic Thought's Royal Islamic Strategic Studies Centre in Amman, Jordan, published Hayward's book, Warfare in the Qur'an, in 2012.

In 2013, the US Air Force published his edited book, Airpower and the Environment: the Ecological Implications of Modern Air Warfare. The Gulf Today newspaper called it "innovative" and a "ground-breaking book highlighting the environmental impact of the world's air forces." In 2013, the American Library Association selected this book as one of that year's 'Notable Government Documents', an annual award list "designed to recognize excellence and raise awareness of information resources produced by all levels of government and promote their use".

In 2017, the Royal Aal al-Bayt Institute for Islamic Thought's Royal Islamic Strategic Studies Centre (RISSC) in Amman, Jordan, published Hayward's short book, "War is Deceit": An Analysis of a Contentious Hadith on the Morality of Military Deception. In 2018, the RISSC published Hayward's monograph, Civilian Immunity in Foundational Islamic Strategic Thought: A Historical Enquiry in both English and Arabic editions.

In 2021, Claritas books published Hayward's book, The Leadership of Muhammad: A Historical Reconstruction. Kirkus Reviews said that Hayward," who is undeniably one of academia's most visible Islamic thinkers," had produced "a learned history of Islam and Muhammad that succeeds in its goal of providing contemporary and future managers with valuable insights from his life on successful leadership strategies". Kirkus praised the book's "full command of Islamic theology and the Arabic language as well as its rich endnotes", and concluded that it "eschews academic and religious jargon for an accessible narrative geared toward the general public, both Muslim and non-Muslim." The San Francisco Book Review wrote that Hayward is a "celebrated historian and strategic studies scholar", called The Leadership of Muhammad a "ground breaking book", and awarded it five stars out of five. Reviewer Foluso Falaye described the book as "a great source of knowledge about Muhammad and the beginning of Islam." He wrote that its "critical approach will appeal to academic minds, although the language is simple and direct enough to carry all readers along." He added that, "in addition to being historically informative, it offers valuable lessons about leadership that could help world leaders, decision makers, teachers, and people from all walks of life to communicate and lead better." The Leadership of Muhammad was awarded the Prize of Best International Non-Fiction Book at the 2021 Sharjah International Book Awards. Hayward said the award was "a tremendous honor," especially because he received it at the hands of Sheikh Sultan bin Muhammad Al-Qasimi, whom he had long esteemed as a leading Islamic scholar and thinker. He said that "writing the book was a labor of love which represented a decade of research."

In his review for For Reading Addicts, Mohamed A. Amer wrote: "Hayward approaches the life of Muhammad with remarkable scholarly detachment and objectivity. He had previously published books on non-Islamic leaders, including Horatio Lord Nelson, and his approach to all of them is the same. Avoiding hagiography, he creates a psychologically believable portrait of Muhammad by critically interrogating the earliest sources and by explaining Muhammad's ideas, actions and patterns of behavior in terms of the historical, geographical and cultural context in which he lived. ... Hayward's book is compactly written and argued. In only 179 tightly written pages he creates a thorough and detailed explanation of what Muhammad thought and did as a leader. He studiously avoids psychobabble and recourse to the types of modern leadership concepts and jargon that ruin so many historical accounts by making anachronistic assertions that couldn't possibly be true. ... I strongly recommend The Leadership of Muhammad. It is a ground-breaking, meticulously researched, objective account of the leadership of one of history's most influential humans. Hayward tells us a lot in a few words, but what he reveals is highly illuminating and of wide interest.

In 2022, Diagolos in Tuzla, Bosnia, published a Busnian edition as Muhammed kao lider: historijska rekonstrukcija. . Late in 2022, Dialogos also published Hayward's book in Bosnian that has yet to be published in English: Etika rata u islamu ("The Ethics of War in Islam") 

In 2022, Claritas Books published Hayward's book The Warrior Prophet: Muhammad and War. Kirkis Reviews called Hayward a "renowned military historian" and noted that, although he "is a self-described 'committed Muslim,' he is uninterested in presenting religious history or defending Muhammad's military competence. Instead ... he seeks to further readers' understanding of 'the historical Muhammad' whose military actions are filtered through a seventh-century Arabic mindset." The reviewer concludes that, "at more than 450 dense pages, the book may be overwhelming to those unfamiliar with Islamic history, though ample reading aids (from maps and charts to timelines and a glossary) are provided. With almost 1,500 endnotes, this is a remarkably well-researched book that has a solid grasp on both contemporary scholarship as well as Arabic primary sources." In a five-star review, Philip Zozzaro of the Manhattan Book Review called The Warrior Prophet "convincing and thought-provoking" and stated that "Hayward contributes a well-researched and annotated study" that "doesn't narrowly focus on wins and losses for Muhammad and his disciples but also delves into the guiding philosophies that Islam teaches. Hayward's book will open the eyes of history devotees as well as those who are well-versed in the life of the esteemed prophet/leader."

Fiction and poetry
In 2003, Totem Press published Hayward's Jenny Green Teeth and other Short Stories (which the Evening Standard reviewed as "superb ... Deep, brooding and intense. ... This is storytelling, and New Zealand fiction, at its best") as well as a volume of poetry called Lifeblood: A Book of Poems (which the Evening Standard reviewed as "memorable and insightful").

The Southern Ocean Review wrote of Jenny Green Teeth: "This is a stunning book of short stories, for their sheer variety and depth, and also strength of language. ... Hayward writes with an eye to truth and justice and historical accuracy. It is up to us to know what to do with writing as superb as this. Can we learn?" The Chaff reviewer wrote of Jenny Green Teeth: "Hayward's eclectic poetry reflects his enigmatic mind. ... His poems are passionate and full of rich images and exert a strong and dignified intelligence. Hayward exerts a courageous strength, rebelling against his past creative constraints, and in perhaps a flush of originality and ambitious flair, has achieved a work of art."

Hayward has continued to publish poems and his second major collection of poems ― titled Splitting the Moon: A Collection of Islamic Poetry ― was published by Kube Publishing in April 2012. The Muslim News reviewer wrote: "Joel Hayward is a very skilful and gifted poet whose way with words is impressive. His poems are easy to understand, highly pertinent and equally spiritually profound".

In 2017 he published his third poetry collection, Poems from the Straight Path: A Book of Islamic Verse. Reviewing Poems from the Straight Path, the UK magazine Passion Islam wrote that "Hayward's journey of exploration, transformation and illumination forms the beating heart of this moving collection of poetry." It called the book "a timely and important work that reveals the struggle and profound insights of someone bridging cultures and faith traditions."

His fourth poetry collection, Pain and Passing: Islamic Poems of Grief & Healing (Swansea: Claritas Books), appeared in early 2018. It deals with the death of his wife Kathy. In an interview, Hayward described this as "undoubtedly the hardest book I've ever written," adding that it was nonetheless a cathartic experience. "After Kathy died I felt I had to write; to release what was fighting inside to get out. I wrote every day, even when tired or busy, and tried to stay responsive to the poems' need for life."

In 2018, Jordanian publisher Dar Al-Shorouk published a book of Hayward's short stories in Arabic as جني ذات الأسنان الخضراء وقصص قصيرة أُخرى  Dar Al-Shorouk published another collection as:  وحشيّ وغيرها من القصص الإسلامية القصيرة.

Also in 2018, Claritas Books published The Savage and other Short Islamic Stories. Regarding the genre of Islamic fiction, Hayward said in a June 2018 interview on his publisher's website that the key "is to see that even within the Islamic tradition there are safe creative spaces into which one can insert fiction. But one has to remember of course, never to attribute to any prophet or esteemed personage something they never said or did. That's where my background as a historian of Islam really helps. I know the sources. I know what they say happened. I therefore know the boundaries of fictional storytelling.

Selected works

Non-fiction
 (1998). Stopped at Stalingrad: The Luftwaffe and Hitler's Defeat in the East 1942-1943. Modern War Studies series. Lawrence, KS: University Press of Kansas. .
— Softcover edition (2000). .
 (2000). (edited). A Joint Future? The Move to Jointness and its Implications for the New Zealand Defence Force. Massey University, Centre for Defence Studies.
 (2000). Adolf Hitler and Joint Warfare. Military Studies Institute Working Papers Series No. 2/2000. Military Studies Institute, New Zealand Defence Force. 
 (2003). For God and Glory: Lord Nelson and His Way of War. Annapolis, MD: U.S. Naval Institute Press. .
— Softcover edition (2019) .
 (2003). (with Glyn Harper). Born to Lead? Portraits of New Zealand Commanders. Auckland: Exisle Publishing. .
 (2006). Stalingrad. Pen & Sword Battleground series. London: Millennium. .
 (2009). (edited). Air Power, Insurgency and the "War on Terror". Royal Air Force Centre for Air Power Studies. .
 (2012). Warfare in the Qur'an English Monograph Series – Book No. 14. Royal Islamic Strategic Studies Centre, Amman, Jordan. .
 (2013). (edited). Airpower and the Environment: the Ecological Implications of Modern Air Warfare. Air University Press. .
 (2015). Zatrzymani pod Stalingradem: Klęska Luftwaffe i Hitlera na wschodzie 1942-1943. Warsaw: 2015. .
 (2017). "War is Deceit": An Analysis of a Contentious Hadith on the Morality of Military Deception.  English Monograph Series – Book No. 24. Royal Islamic Strategic Studies Centre, Amman, Jordan. .
 (2018). Civilian Immunity in Foundational Islamic Strategic Thought: A Historical Enquiry.  English Monograph Series – Book No. 25. Royal Islamic Strategic Studies Centre, Amman, Jordan. .
 (2018).  الحصانة المدنية في الفكر الاستراتيجي الإسلامي التأسيسي : تحقيقٌ تاريخي .  Arabic Monograph Series. Royal Islamic Strategic Studies Centre, Amman, Jordan. .
 (2020). Islamic Principles of War for the 21st Century. English Monograph Series – Book No. 26. Royal Islamic Strategic Studies Centre, Amman, Jordan. .
 (2021).  لله وللمجد: اللورد نيلسون وأسلوبه في الحرب. Amman: Dar Osama (2021). .
 (2021). The Leadership of Muhammad: A Historical Reconstruction. Swansea, UK: Claritas Books. .
 (2021). Muhammed kao lider: historijska rekonstrukcija. Tuzla: Dialogos, 2022. .
 (2021). Etika rata u islamu. Tuzla: Dialogos, 2022. .
 (2022). The Warrior Prophet: Muhammad and War. Swansea, UK: Claritas Books. .

Fiction and poetry
 (2003). Jenny Green Teeth and other Short Stories. Palmerston North, New Zealand: Totem Press. .
 (2003). Lifeblood: A Book of Poems. Palmerston North, New Zealand: Totem Press. .
 (2012). Splitting the Moon: A Collection of Islamic Poetry. Leicester: Kube Publishing. .
 (2012). No Lamp in the Cave: Three Islamic Short Stories. CreateSpace. .
 (2017). Poems from the Straight Path: A Book of Islamic Verse. Ashland, Oregon: White Cloud Press. .
 (2018). Pain and Passing: Islamic Poems of Grief & Healing (Swansea: Claritas Books).
 (2018). جني ذات الأسنان الخضراء وقصص قصيرة أُخرى. (Amman: Dar Al-Shorouk, 2018). .
 (2018). وحشيّ وغيرها من القصص الإسلامية القصيرة (Amman: Dar Al-Shorouk, 2018). .
 (2018). The Savage and other Short Islamic Stories (Swansea: Claritas Books).

References

External links

Joel Hayward on 1st Witness Agency page Hayward bio on 1st Witness Agency website.
Joel Hayward's Khalifa University web page Official Khalifa University web page.
Joel Hayward's Books and Articles – current information on publications; includes text of several journal articles.
Joel Hayward's Poetry – Hayward's first published poetry book and assembled poems to be published in his second collection.
Joel Hayward Raban Academy 2022 – Official Rabdan Academy page.

1964 births
Academics of King's College London
Air force historians
British military historians
British Muslims
Converts to Islam
Muslim poets
21st-century Muslim scholars of Islam
Sunni Muslim scholars of Islam
British historians of Islam
Historical negationism
Living people
Academic staff of the Massey University
20th-century New Zealand historians
New Zealand poets
New Zealand male poets
New Zealand male short story writers
Writers from Christchurch
University of Canterbury alumni
Fellows of the Royal Historical Society
New Zealand Muslims
New Zealand emigrants to the United Kingdom
Islamic scholars in the United Kingdom
Academic staff of Khalifa University
20th-century British historians
21st-century New Zealand historians
20th-century Muslim scholars of Islam